Bittium midwayense is a species of sea snail, a marine gastropod mollusk in the family Cerithiidae.

Description

Distribution

References

Kosuge S. (1979) Report on the Mollusca on guyots from the Central Pacific collected by the 2nd and 3rd cruises of R/V Kaiyomaru in 1972 to 73 with descriptions of twelve new species. Bulletin of the Institute of Malacology, Tokyo 1(2): 24–35, pls 5–6.page(s): 30, pl. 5 fig. 1

Cerithiidae
Gastropods described in 1979